= Pepe Fernández (photographer) =

Argentine photographer (1928–2006)

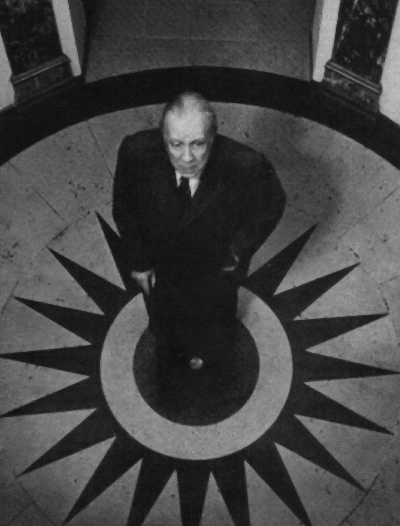
Jorge Luis Borges photographed in Paris by Pepe Fernández.

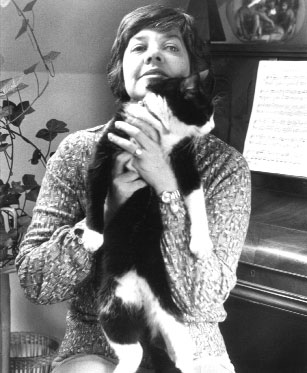
María Elena Walsh by Pepe Fernández, to whom she dedicated Zamba para Pepe.

José María Fernández (Buenos Aires, 16 December 1928 - Paris, 14 July 2006), better known as Pepe Fernández, was an Argentine photographer, writer and pianist who lived in France since the 1960s.
